Human platelet antigens (HPA) are polymorphisms in platelet antigens. These can stimulate production of alloantibodies (that is, antibodies against other people's antigens) in recipients of transfused platelets from donors with different HPAs. These antibodies cause neonatal alloimmune thrombocytopenia, post-transfusion purpura, and some cases of platelet transfusion refractoriness to infusion of donor platelets.


Overview
A nomenclature was devised by International Society of Blood Transfusion (ISBT), platelet working party to overcome problems generated by many different nomenclatures in use. Since inception of this list, a greater number of antigens have been described and the molecular basis of many has been resolved.

To date, 24 platelet-specific alloantigens have been defined by immune sera, of which 12 are grouped in six biallelic systems (HPA-1, -2, -3, -4, -5, -15). For the remaining 12, alloantibodies against the thetical but not the antithetical antigen have been observed. The molecular basis of 22 of the 24 serologically defined antigens has been resolved. In all but one of the 22, the difference between self and non-self is defined by a single amino acid substitution generally caused by a single-nucleotide polymorphism (SNP).

References

External links
 http://www.ebi.ac.uk/ipd/hpa/
 

Antibodies
Blood cells
Transfusion medicine
Blood antigen systems